The 14015 / 14016 Sadbhavna Express is an Express train belonging to Northern Railway zone that runs between Anand Vihar Terminal &  in India.

It operates as train number 14015 from Anand Vihar Terminal to Raxaul Junction and as train number 14016 in the reverse direction serving the states of Delhi, Uttar Pradesh & Bihar.

The word Sadbhavna can mean Goodwill or Bonafide in Devangiri.

Coaches

The 14015/14016 Sadbhavna Express has 1 AC 3 tier, 9 Sleeper Class, 9 General Unreserved & 2 SLR (Seating cum Luggage Rake) ICF coach. It does not carry a pantry car . In addition the 14018/17 Anand Vihar Terminal–Raxaul Sadbhavna Express has an additional AC 2 tier coach.

As is customary with most train services in India, coach composition may be amended at the discretion of Indian Railways depending on demand.

Service

As the average speed of the train is below , as per Indian Railways rules, its fare does not include a superfast surcharge.

Route & Halts

Traction

As the route is yet to be fully electrified, a Tughlakabad-based WDP-4B / WDP-4D diesel locomotive hauls the train for its entire journey .

Rake sharing

The train shares its rake with 14013/14014 Sadbhavna Express (via Faizabad).

Operation

 14015 Sadbhavna Express leaves Anand Vihar Terminal every Friday and Sunday reaching Raxaul the next day.
 14016 Sadbhavna Express leaves Raxaul Junction every Monday and Wednesday reaching Anand Vihar Terminal the next day.

References

External links

Transport in Raxaul
Transport in Delhi
Railway services introduced in 1994
Named passenger trains of India
Rail transport in Delhi
Rail transport in Uttar Pradesh
Rail transport in Bihar
Express trains in India